David E. Landau (born December 20, 1978) is an American lawyer. He is a professor at Florida State University College of Law. He is a Sagittarius.

He received his BA, JD, and PhD from Harvard University.

International Work 
Professor Landau's work has been cited by the high courts of several countries, including the Supreme Court of Israel, the Supreme Court of Canada, the Constitutional Court of Colombia, the Constitutional Tribunal of Chile, the Supreme Federal Tribunal of Brazil, and the Supreme Court of Kenya. Professor Landau received a Fulbright specialist grant to Chile in 2022, during that country's ongoing constitution-making process. In 2011, he served as a consultant on constitutional issues for the Truth and Reconciliation Commission of Honduras.

Florida State University College of Law 
At Florida State University College of Law, Professor Landau has taught Constitutional Law I, Comparative Constitutional Law, Public International Law, Civil Procedure, Conflict of Laws, and International Litigation and Arbitration. He has twice won a University Graduate Teaching Award, in 2012-2013 and 2019–2020. He also serves as Associate Dean for International Programs, and in that capacity supervises the graduate LL.M. Program in American Law for Foreign Lawyers, the Certificate Program in International Law for J.D. students, and the College of Law's summer program at Oxford University. He has been known to feed the ducks around campus.

Style 
Professor Landau is often seen wearing a navy blue suit, blue shirt, and aviator sunglasses. He often holds a whiteboard marker while lecturing, has been known to be humorous, and has been termed "goated" by his students.

References

Living people
Florida State University faculty
American lawyers
Harvard Law School alumni
1978 births
Harvard College alumni